Mayra de Fatima Gmach (born ) is a Brazilian group rhythmic gymnast. She represents her nation at international competitions. She competed at world championships, including at the 2014  World Rhythmic Gymnastics Championships. 

She has two sisters who are also rhythmic gymnasts: Morgana Gmach and Monize Gmach. All three sisters have represented Brazil internationally, winning medals at the South American Rhythmic Gymnastics Championships.

References

1996 births
Living people
Brazilian rhythmic gymnasts
Place of birth missing (living people)